Isaac Rosenberg (25 November 1890 – 1 April 1918) was an English poet and artist. His Poems from the Trenches are recognized as some of the most outstanding poetry written during the First World War.

Early life
Isaac Rosenberg was born in Bristol, the second of six children and the eldest son (his twin brother died at birth) of his parents, Barnett (formerly Dovber) and Hacha Rosenberg, who were Lithuanian Jewish immigrants to Britain from Dvinsk (now in Latvia). In 1897, the family moved to Stepney, a poor district of the East End of London, and one with a large Jewish community. Isaac Rosenberg attended St. Paul's Primary School at Wellclose Square, St George in the East parish. Later, he went to the Baker Street Board School in Stepney, which had a strong Jewish presence. In 1902, he received a good conduct award and was allowed to take classes at the Arts and Crafts School in Stepney Green. In December 1904, he left the Baker Street School, and in January 1905, started an apprenticeship with Carl Hentschel, an engraver from Fleet Street.

He became interested in both poetry and visual art, and started to attend evening classes at Birkbeck College. He withdrew from his apprenticeship in January 1911, as he had managed to find the finances to attend the Slade School of Fine Art at University College, London (UCL). During his time at Slade School, Rosenberg notably studied alongside David Bomberg, Mark Gertler, Stanley Spencer, Paul Nash, Edward Wadsworth, Dora Carrington, William Roberts, and Christopher Nevinson. He was taken up by Laurence Binyon and Edward Marsh, and began to write poetry seriously, but he suffered from ill-health. He published a pamphlet of ten poems, Night and Day, in 1912. He also exhibited paintings at the Whitechapel Gallery in 1914.

Afraid that his chronic bronchitis would worsen, Rosenberg hoped to cure himself by relocating in 1914 to the warmer climate of South Africa, where his sister Mina lived in Cape Town. The Jewish Educational Aid Society of London helped by paying the fare.

After arriving in Cape Town in the end of June 1914, he composed a poem On Receiving News of the War. While many wrote about war as patriotic sacrifice, Rosenberg was critical of it from the outset. However, feeling better and hoping to find employment as an artist in Britain, Rosenberg returned home in March 1915. He published a second collection of poems, Youth and then after being unable to find a permanent job enlisted in the British Army at the end of October 1915. He asked that half of his pay be sent to his mother.

In a personal letter, Rosenberg described his attitude towards war, "I never joined the army for patriotic reasons. Nothing can justify war. I suppose we must all fight to get the trouble over."

First World War

Rosenberg was assigned to the 12th Bantam Battalion of the Suffolk Regiment, a bantam being a designation for men under the usual minimum height of 5'3". After apparently declining promotion to lance corporal, Rosenberg was transferred, first, to the South Lancashire Regiment, then to the King's Own Royal Lancaster Regiment. He was sent with his unit to serve on the Western Front in France, where he arrived on 3 June 1916. He continued to write poetry while serving in the trenches, including "Break of Day in the Trenches", "Returning We Hear the Larks", and "Dead Man's Dump". In December 1916, Poetry Magazine published two of his poems.

In January 1917, Rosenberg reported being sick and his family and friends asked his superiors to remove him from the front lines; he was transferred to the Fortieth Division Works Battalion and started to deliver barbed wire to the trenches. He wrote his poem Dead Man's Dump during this period.

In June, he was temporarily assigned to the 229 Field Company, Royal Engineers. In September 1916, he spent ten days in London on leave. After returning to his old unit, he fell sick in October and spent two months in the 51st General Hospital. After release, he was transferred to the 1st Battalion of the King's Own Royal Regiment (KORL). He applied for a transfer to one of the all-Jewish battalions formed in Mesopotamia, but historians have been unable to trace his application.

On 21 March 1918, the German Army started its Spring Offensive on the Western Front. A week later, Rosenberg sent his last letter with the poem "Through These Pale Cold Days" to England before going to the front lines with reinforcements. Having just finished a night patrol, he was killed on the night of 1 April 1918 with another ten KORL soldiers; there is a dispute as to whether his death occurred at the hands of a sniper or in close combat. In either case, he died in a town called Fampoux, northeast of Arras. He was first buried in a mass grave, but in 1926 the unidentified remains of the six KORL soldiers were individually re-interred at Bailleul Road East Cemetery, Plot V, Saint-Laurent-Blangy, Pas de Calais, France. Rosenberg's gravestone is marked with his name and the words, "Buried near this spot", as well as – "Artist and Poet".

Legacy
 His self-portraits hang in the National Portrait Gallery and Tate Britain.

 A commemorative blue plaque to him hangs outside the Whitechapel Gallery, formerly the Whitechapel Library, which was unveiled by Anglo-Jewish writer Emanuel Litvinoff.
 On 11 November 1985, Rosenberg was among 16 Great War poets who were commemorated on a slate stone unveiled in Westminster Abbey's Poet's Corner. The inscription on the stone was written by a fellow Great War poet, Wilfred Owen. It reads: "My subject is War, and the pity of War. The Poetry is in the pity."

 Rosenberg appears in the novel Grosse Fugue by Ian Phillips.
 In The Great War and Modern Memory, Paul Fussell's landmark study of the literature of the First World War, Fussell identifies Rosenberg's "Break of Day in the Trenches" as "the greatest poem of the war."
 BBC Radio 4 broadcast a documentary on his life called "Nobody Told Me To Oil My Boots", written and directed by Neil Cargill with narration by Sir Antony Sher and Simon Schatzberger – re-broadcast by Radio 4Extra.

References
 Geoff Akers – Beating for Light: The Story of Isaac Rosenberg (2006)
 Jean Moorcroft Wilson – Isaac Rosenberg, poet and painter (1975)
 Word and Image VI. Isaac Rosenberg 1890–1918 (National Book League, 1975)
 Jean Liddiard – Isaac Rosenberg; the Half Used Life (1975)
 J. Cohen – Journey to the Trenches: The Life of Isaac Rosenberg 1890–1918 (1975)
 Deborah Maccoby – God Made Blind: The Life and Work of Isaac Rosenberg (1999 Symposium Press)
 Harold Finch – The Tower Hamlets Connection – a Biographical Guide (Stepney Books )
 Six Poets of the Great War: Wilfred Owen, Siegfried Sassoon, Isaac Rosenberg, Richard Aldington, Edmund Blunden, Edward Thomas, Rupert Brooke and Many Others. (edited by Adrian Barlow) Cambridge University Press, 1995; 
 Poets of the Great War: Wilfred Owen, Siegfried Sassoon, Isaac Rosenberg, Richard Aldington, Edmund Blunden, Edward Thomas, Rupert Brooke, and Many Others. (Naxos AudioBooks)
 Isaac Rosenberg – Selected Poems and Letters ed. Jean Liddiard (Enitharmon, 2003)
 Jon Stallworthy, ‘Rosenberg, Isaac (1890–1918)’, Oxford Dictionary of National Biography, Oxford University Press, 2004 accessed 2 October 2013
 Isaac Rosenberg – Selected Poems and Letters ed. Jean Liddiard (Enitharmon, 2003)
 William Baker– Whitechapel at War: Isaac Rosenberg and his Circle (Ben Uri Gallery and Museum, 2009)

Notes

External links
 
 The Isaac Rosenberg Collection  in The First World War Poetry Digital Archive  by Oxford University contains images of all Rosenberg's War poetry manuscripts, letters, plus a searchable full text corpus.
 Rosenberg's Early Poetry and Related Documents at the University of South Carolina Library's Digital Collections Page
 Lost Poets of the Great War, a hypertext document on the poetry of World War I by Harry Rusche, of Emory University. It contains a bibliography of related materials.
 Selected Poetry of Isaac Rosenberg – Biography and 5 poems (Dead Man's Dump, God, The Jew, Louse Hunting, Through These Pale Cold Days)
 
 
 Isaac Rosenberg profile and poems at Poets.org

1890 births
1918 deaths
Burials in France
20th-century English painters
20th-century English poets
20th-century English male writers
Alumni of the Slade School of Fine Art
British Army personnel of World War I
British military personnel killed in World War I
English Jews
English male painters
English male poets
English people of Latvian-Jewish descent
English people of Russian-Jewish descent
English World War I poets
Jewish poets
King's Own Royal Regiment soldiers
Writers from Bristol
Suffolk Regiment soldiers
Whitechapel Boys
Lost Generation writers
Military personnel from Bristol
20th-century English male artists